Moti Lugasi (born April 18, 1992) is an Israeli taekwondo athlete.  He won a bronze medal at the age of 18 in the 54 kg (fin) class at the 2010 European Taekwondo Championships.

References

External links
 

1992 births
Living people
Israeli male taekwondo practitioners
Israeli people of Moroccan-Jewish descent
European Taekwondo Championships medalists
21st-century Israeli people